Adams-Ryan House is a historic inn located at Adams Basin in the town of Ogden in Monroe County, New York. It was constructed about 1825 and is a rare surviving example of an inn that operated along the towpath of the Erie Canal. The original structure reflects a vernacular Federal style. Later alterations added vernacular Greek Revival style details. Throughout the 19th century there were several additions to the original structure and in 1912 it underwent further alterations and remodeling. It ceased operating as an inn in 1916 and was virtually abandoned between 1939 and 1972. Also on the property are a contributing barn and privy. It is now operated as a bed and breakfast.

It was listed on the National Register of Historic Places on September 5, 1985.

References

External links
National Register of Historic Places

Hotel buildings on the National Register of Historic Places in New York (state)
Federal architecture in New York (state)
Hotel buildings completed in 1825
Houses in Monroe County, New York
National Register of Historic Places in Monroe County, New York
[[Category:1825 establishments in New York (state)